Events from the year 1719 in Scotland.

Incumbents 

 Secretary of State for Scotland: The Duke of Roxburghe

Law officers 
 Lord Advocate – Sir David Dalrymple, 1st Baronet
 Solicitor General for Scotland – Robert Dundas

Judiciary 
 Lord President of the Court of Session – Lord North Berwick
 Lord Justice General – Lord Ilay
 Lord Justice Clerk – Lord Grange

Events 

 March – a Jacobite invasion force sets out from Cádiz in Spain but is dispersed by storms and only two ships reach Scotland.
 10 May – Capture of Eilean Donan Castle: A British naval force capture Eilean Donan from occupying Spanish troops.
 10 June – Battle of Glen Shiel: British Government troops defeat an alliance of Jacobite and Spanish forces. Spanish forces had supported the Jacobites, under the command of Major General Wightman, in an effort to strain the British Government's resources.
 1 September – Marriage ceremony of Prince James Francis Edward Stuart ("Old Pretender" to the Scottish throne) and Princess Maria Clementina Sobieska at Montefiascone in Italy.
 Earliest known Newcomen atmospheric engines in Scotland at Stevenston (north Ayrshire) and at Elphinstone, East Lothian (near Tranent).
 Earliest known record of Belhaven Brewery near Dunbar.

Births 
 5 May – Andrew Meikle, mechanical engineer and inventor (died 1811)
 25 December – George Campbell, Enlightenment philosopher, Presbyterian minister, theologian and professor of divinity (died 1796)
 William Rose, schoolmaster and classical scholar (died 1786)

Deaths 
 29 May – Sir Alexander Seton, 1st Baronet, judge (born c.1639)
 24 June – James Sutherland, botanist (born c.1638/9)

The arts
 Allan Ramsay publishes Content and a new volume of Scots Songs.

See also 

 Timeline of Scottish history

References 

 
Years of the 18th century in Scotland
Scotland
1710s in Scotland